The 1977–78 season was Cardiff City F.C.'s 51st season in the Football League. They competed in the 22-team Division Two, then the second tier of English football, finishing nineteenth.

Players

First team squad.

League standings

Results by round

Fixtures and results

Second Division

Source

League Cup

FA Cup

European Cup Winners Cup

Welsh Cup

See also
Cardiff City F.C. seasons

References

Bibliography

Cardiff City F.C. seasons
Association football clubs 1977–78 season
Card